Jagdfliegerführer 1 was part of Luftflotte 2 (Air Fleet 2), one of the primary divisions of the German Luftwaffe in World War II. It was formed on December 21, 1939 in Jever. Jagdfliegerführer 1 was redesignated Jagdfliegerführer Mitte on April 1, 1941. The headquarters was located at Jever and from July 1940 on in Stade.

Commanding officers
 Generalleutnant Theodor Osterkamp, 22 July 1940 – 31 December 1940

References
Notes

Luftwaffe Fliegerführer
Military units and formations established in 1939
1939 establishments in Germany
Military units and formations disestablished in 1940